The Stazione Zoologica Anton Dohrn is a research institute in Naples, Italy, devoted to basic research in biology. Research is largely interdisciplinary involving the fields of evolution, biochemistry, molecular biology, neurobiology, cell biology, biological oceanography, marine botany, molecular plant biology, benthic ecology, and ecophysiology.

Founded in 1872 as a private concern by Anton Dohrn, in 1982 the Stazione Zoologica came under the supervision and control of the Ministero dell'Università e della Ricerca Scientifica e Tecnologica (Ministry of Universities and Scientific and Technological Research) as a National Institute.

History

The idea
Dohrn's idea was to establish an international scientific community provided with laboratory space, equipment, research material and a library. This was supported and funded by the German Government, Thomas Henry Huxley, Charles Darwin, Francis Balfour and Charles Lyell among others. Dohrn provided a substantial sum himself. Running costs were paid from income derived from the bench system, the sale of scientific journals and specimens and the income from the public aquarium. This system was an important innovations in management of research and it worked. When Anton Dohrn died in 1909 more than 2,200 scientists from Europe and the United States had worked at Stazione Zoologica and more than 50 tables-per-year had been rented out.

"Report of the Committee, consisting of Dr. Anton Dohrn, Professor Rolleston and Mr. P. L. Sclater, appointed for the purpose of promoting the Foundation of Zoological Stations in different parts of the World:—Reporter, Dr. Dohrn [Jena]."-"The Committee beg to report that since the last Meeting of the British Association at Liverpool steps have been taken by Dr. Dohrn to secure the moral assistance of some other scientific bodies, and that the Academy of Belgium has passed a vote acknowledging the great value of the proposed Observatories. Besides this, the Government at Berlin has given instruction to the German Embassy at Florence and to the General Consul at Naples to do everything to secure success to Dr. Dohrn's enterprise. Next October the building at Naples will be commenced under the personal superintendence of Dr. Dohrn, who will be accompanied by the assistant architect of the Berlin Aquarium. The contractors agree to finish the building in one year, so that in January 1873 the Aquarium in Naples may be expected to be in working order." British Association for the Advancement of Science Report on the 1871 Meeting in Edinburgh

The building
The oldest building of the zoological station was opened in 1874. A second building connected to the western end of the first by bridges was added in 1886 and a third was built in 1906 for the new science of comparative physiology. In 1910 the 1874 building was occupied by the public aquarium and the library only, the department for collecting and preserving organisms as well as the individual laboratories for zoologists having been relocated in the 1886 addition.

People

The first assistants were zoologists Nicolaus Kleinenberg and Hugo Eisig and one of the Preparators was Salvatore Lobianco (Lo Bianco) (1860–1910), who wrote The Methods Employed at the Naples Zoological Station for the Preservation of Marine Animals. Others were Dr. Brandt (librarian); Dr. Lang; Dr. Giesbrecht; Petersen (engineer). By 1910 the permanent staff were Professor Dr. Paul Mayer and Dr. Gross, morphology; Dr. Burian, comparative physiology; Dr. Henze, chemistry; Dr. Gast, the museum; Hermann Linden, secretary; Sig. Santorelli, Preparator. Zoologists and morphologists were the first guests of the new Institute. Included were Heinrich Wilhelm Gottfried von Waldeyer-Hartz, Francis Balfour, Ray Lankester, August Weismann, Giovanni Battista Grassi, Antonio della Valle, Oskar Schmidt, Ambrosius Hubrecht (Professor of Utrecht University, an embryologist).

In 1897 Ida Henrietta Hyde was invited to occupy a table at the institute. She went on to fund raise to help establish the American Women's Table at the Stazione Zoologica Anton Dohrn. This table was subsequently held by American women zoologists such as Emily Ray Gregory.

Publications
The three publications issued by the Station were:- Mittheilungen der Zoologischen Station in Neapel, Zoologischer Jahresbericht a reference journal famous for its rapid publication and accuracy and Fauna und Flora des Golfes von Neapel an inventory of the biota of Mediterranean (in 1876 Anton Dohrn added a section of Botany),

Library
Charles Darwin had advised Dohrn that establishing a library would be unwise (Groeben, 1982, p. 29). Dohrn argued that availability of all the major published sources was essential. He gave his own books and scientific journals to the Station and persuaded publishers and scientists to donate their publications. The Naples Station's biological reference collection is still unrivalled in Europe today. The first librarian was Emil Schoebel.

Equipment
The station maintained a high level of technical services. Ernst Abbe (1840–1905) of the Zeiss factory, a close friend, supplied sets of Zeiss instruments at low prices, thus bringing Zeiss equipment, sometimes improved, to the attention of the international scientific community. Assistants and guests collaborated in improving section-cutting and staining. For collecting there were several manned boats, including the steamers "Johannes Muller" and "Francis Balfour". An engineer and assisting machinists maintained the aquarium and a trained mechanic made instruments for experimental investigations.

The aquarium
The aquarium was constructed by William Alford Lloyd . Dohrn had met 
Lloyd in 1866 in Hamburg.

Culture
Anton Dohrn followed Goethe in considering arts and science inseparable. He was devoted to music and in 1873 employed Hans von Marées (1837–1887) and Adolf von Hildebrand to enhance Stazione Zoologica with art works.

Later history
Anton Dohrn's son Reinhard Dohrn (1880–1962) continued his father's work from 1909. Peter Dohrn (1917–2007) acted as director between 1954 and 1967. From 1967 to 1976 SZN was led by a Commissario Straordinario. In 1976 following the appointment of Alberto Monroy, an embryologist, as Director a radical reorganisation began. SZN was divided into five parts: Biological Oceanography, Benthic Ecology (at the Villa Dohrn in Ischia), Biochemistry, Cell and Developmental Biology and Neurobiology and. In 1982 SZN became an "Ente pubblico di ricerca (National Research Institute) under the directorship of Antonio Miralto. In 1987 Gaetano Salvatore, dean of the Medical School of Università Federico II in Napoli, was appointed president of the Stazione Zoologica. After his death in 1997, Professor Giorgio Bernardi was appointed as president. He launched the study of molecular evolution "at the institutional level" completing Dohrn's vision.

People associated with SZN
Wilhelm Giesbrecht
René-Édouard Claparède
Heinrich Otto Wilhelm Bürger 
George Stuart Carter FRSE
Francis Gerald William Knowles FRS 1937-38 and intermittently thereafter to 1974
Richard Parkinson
Hans Adolf Eduard Driesch
Arthur Henry Reginald Buller Researcher, 1900-1901 on the fertilization of sea urchin eggs
Carl Vogt (1879 and 1884)
Emil du Bois-Reymond (1878)
Gaetano Chierchia Naturalist on the Italian research ship Vettor Pisani.
James Dewey Watson
Angelo Andres
Ernst Ehlers
Charles Otis Whitman Mid-1870s early 1880s with Emily Nunn
Carl Chun
William Morton Wheeler Research in Münich, Naples, Liège, 1893-1894
Hermon Carey Bumpus Research, Münich, Naples 1893
Friedrich Alfred Krupp
Vladimir Timofeyevich Szewiakow
Jakob von Uexküll
Albrecht Bethe :de:Albrecht Bethe
August Weismann
Adolf Naef
Ernest Everett Just
Otto Heinrich Warburg
Fridtjof Nansen
Robert Francis Scharff
Gottlieb von Koch (1849–1914) Professor of Zoology at the Technical School, Darmstadt. He wrote  "Die Gorgoniden des Golfes von Neapel und der angrenzenden Meeresabschnitte..." published in Berlin in 1887 and published on octocorals between 1874 and 1891.
Theodor Boveri and Marcella Boveri
Raphael Weldon, who visited in summer 1882, working on Lacerta muralis, the common wall lizard, and then later (on his honeymoon) in spring 1883. Pearson's obituary of Weldon (p. 10) reports that "At Easter (1884) Banyuls was visited, and the summer vacation found Weldon in Naples again for the three months preparing his fellowship dissertation (for Cambridge). In Naples the cholera had broken out, and the Weldons experienced not only difficulty in getting the precious dissertation back to England, but in returning themselves."
 Francis Maitland Balfour (See Letter 9289 — Charles Darwin to F.A. Dohrn 13 February 1874: "F. M. Balfour to visit Naples").
 Jerome Y. Lettvin. Researched octopus visual neurophysiology in the summers of 1959, 1961, and 1963.
 John Zachary Young. Neurophysiologist, honored with Stazione Zoologica gold medal.
 Ida Henrietta Hyde
 George Wilton Field (1892–1893)
 Thomas Hunt Morgan (1894)
 David Fairchild (1894)
 Raffaello Bellini
 Grigore Antipa
 Nino Salvatore
 Rachel Leech (1959-60) studying chloroplast cytochromes

Further reading
Christiane Groeben, 2006  The Stazione Zoologica Anton Dohrn as a place for the circulation of scientific ideas: vision and management in Anderson, K.L. & C. Thiery (eds.). 2006. Information for Responsible Fisheries : Libraries as Mediators : proceedings of the 31st Annual Conference:Rome, Italy, October 10 – 14, 2005.
C. B. Metz, editor; P. L. Clapp, assistant editor, 1985  The Naples Zoological Station and the Marine Biological Laboratory:One hundred years of Biology  Biological Bulletin Volume 168 Number 3 Symposium Supplement to the Biological Bulletin  Free download
Dohrn, A. 1892. Aus Vergangenheit und Gegenwart der Zoologischen Station zu Neapel. – Deutsche Rundschau 72: 275–298.
Bernardino Fantini, 2000 The 'Stazione Zoologica Anton Dohrn' and the history of embryologyThe International Journal of Developmental Biology 44(6):523-35 · February 2000 pdf
Maria Cristina Gambi et al., 2013 The Archivio Moncharmont: a Pioneering Biodiversity Assessment in the Gulf of Naples (Italy) Conference paper: In: Groeben C. (Ed), Places, People, Tools: Oceanography in the Mediterranean and Beyond., At Napoli (Italy), Volume: Pubblicazioni della Stazione Zoologica di Napoli 4: 459-467 pdf

See also
Observatoire Oceanologique de Villefranche
Oceanographic Museum Monaco (Musée Océanographique)
List of oceanographic institutions and programs
Biogem Institute

References

External links 

 Homepage of the Stazione Zoologica Anton Dohrn Includes history of the Stazione Zoologica Anton Dohrn
 Zoological Collection Database Impressive. Images of specimens and archival documents. Includes a history.
 
 Encyclopædia Britannica Eleventh Edition account at Project Gutenberg  
 Stazione zoologica di Napoli Guide to the aquarium of the Zoological Station at Naples Leipzig :Breitkopf & Härtel, 1913. 8th edition. 
 Dohrn family Istituto Mazzini Napoli
 BHL Guide to the aquarium of the Zoological station at Naples. Leipzig :Breitkopf & Härtel,1896.
 The Zoological Station at Naples Popular Science Monthly
 Nature 1872 Letter to Nature Titled "The Foundation of Zoological Stations Full text.

Research institutes in Italy
Biological stations
Marine botany
1872 establishments in Italy
Museums in Naples
Education in Naples
Research institutes established in 1872
1872 in biology